Epirotiki was a shipping company that began in 1850. Epirotiki Line operated cruise vessels, cargo and tanker vessels.

Foundation 
Anastassios Potamianos began his first shipping venture in 1850 transporting cargo and passengers along the River Danube between the island of Cephalonia and the city of Brăila. Assisting Anastassios was his nephew, Giorgos Potamianos. When Anastassios Potamianos died in 1902 Giorgos undertook the management of the company and took the emblem of the Byzantine Cross as the company's trademark, and changed the company name to Epirotiki. In 1916 Giorgos moved to the new centre of shipping of Piraeus, acquiring his first steam powered ship. By 1926 the company owned 15 passenger vessels ranging between 800 and 1500 GRT.

World War II 
During World War II, Piraeus was destroyed by German air attacks on the city. Only one vessel was saved, the G.Potamianos, which was appropriated by the Allies. At the conclusion of the war Epirotiki began its revival with the acquisition of three ships, ushering in its modern era.

Modern era 

Initially Epirotiki focused entirely on the cruise ship market and started round trip cruises operating in the Aegean Sea, Greek Islands and Eastern Mediterranean. Acquisitions of vessels such as Semiramis, Pegasus (I) and Hermes helped in the company's expansion. In the 1960s, Epirotiki continued to expand its operation, adding a number of Caribbean destinations. Vessels acquired in this period included the Argonaut, Jason, Orpheus, Apollon XI, and Poseidon among others.

The cruise industry grew quickly in the 1970s, and Epirotiki became the largest cruise ship company in Greece and the Eastern Mediterranean with additions to its fleet such as the Jupiter, Oceanos, World Renaissance, Odysseus,  Mistral, Pegasus (II) and Triton. During the 1980s and after the company diversified into dry cargo carriers and crude oil tankers under separate management.

Epirotiki Lines reached South America in 1978 operating out of São Paulo to take advantage of the fact that Italian lines could not handle the number of tourists in the tropical summer high season. The Greek company used the Atlantis with a crew of Greeks, Italians (mostly) and some Brazilians (mostly chambermaids, to facilitate dialogue on board. The tour operator sold round-trip cruises using the Single Cabin regime, with relative success. This vessel was once the Adonis, sister ship to the fleet's Eros and Jason; all refurbished as luxury tourist ships. The route chosen along the Brazilian coast linked the ports of Santos (SP), Angra dos Reis (RJ) and Rio de Janeiro (RJ). It is reported that one of the heiresses of the Hellenic business came aboard from Greece, a shaggy, purple short-haired, sixty-year-old lady, overseeing the vessel's services herself. In this business, the Consulate of Greece in Brazil, in Salvador (BA), nurtured the transatlantic booths with extensive printed tourist material with colour photographs and several maps with simulated 2-D terrestrial relief, with the main sea routes of the Greek coast and shorelines.

The peak of the company's global operations was reached in 1990, with the Greek headquarters in Piraeus (Akit Miaouli, 87), consolidating offices in London (6 Quadrant Arcade, Regent St), Paris (8, Rue Auber 9a), Rome (Via Barberini, 47) and New York City (608 Fifth Ave), and for South America business its general representative and travel agent for the Latin America market was the partner Airtour Operator, in São Paulo.

In the marine tourism sector Epirotiki consolidated its position through partnerships and mergers. In 1993 Epirotiki made a partnership with Carnival Cruise Lines, purchasing ships from Carnival in exchange for shares in Epirotiki. The company acquired the vessels Pallas Athena, Olympic and Apollon (II).

Around the same time, however, the company faced difficulties, as three of its cruise ships (Jupiter, Pegasus and Oceanos) sank between 1988 and 1991.

In 1995 Epirotiki merged its operations with Sun Line, creating a new company named Royal Olympic Cruise Lines. Initially maintaining its two brand names, Royal Olympic Cruise Lines began planning a public offering of the company in 1997. The company restructured its holdings, creating a new entity, Royal Olympia Cruise Lines, and listed on the NASDAQ stock exchange (ROCLF) in 1998. The new company collapsed in 2005 and its ships were sold off.

Fleet 
A list of operating vessels in the fleet:

Former Fleet

Controversies 

Captain Yiannis Avranas and four of the crew of the Oceanos were found guilty of negligence after the ship sank in 1991, for abandoning ship without broadcasting a mayday, alerting the passengers or properly assisting in their evacuation.  Despite the judgement, their behaviour was defended by the then head of Epirotiki Line and Captain Avranas continued to command a vessel until his retirement.

References

External links 
 Company History at Answers.com
 Simplon postcards
 Maritime Matters

Defunct shipping companies
Shipping companies of Greece
Defunct cruise lines
Companies based in Piraeus
Transport companies established in 1850
Defunct transport companies of Greece
1850s establishments in Greece